Wuyang New Town is a place in Guangzhou, Guangdong, China. It is located at the west of Zhujiang New Town and the north of Ersha Island in Yuexiu District. It acts as central business district (CBD) among North Tianhe District, Zhujiang New Town and Pazhou (the place where Canton Fair is held).

There is a Guangzhou Metro station in the area called Wuyangcun Station.

See also 
Wuyangcun Station

References

Central business districts in China
Yuexiu District